The United Wrestling Network (UWN) Television Championship is a title controlled by, and defended in Championship Wrestling from Hollywood, sanctioned by the governing body United Wrestling Network.

On July 10, 2011, Scorpio Sky pinned So Cal Crazy after hitting the "Ace of Spades" to win the "Be the Star" Television Title Tournament to be crowned the first NWA International Television Champion. After Championship Wrestling from Hollywood parted ways with the National Wrestling Alliance (NWA), the Championship was renamed the CWFH International Television Championship. In 2013, the title was again renamed the MAV Television Championship. During 2015, the title was renamed to United Wrestling Network Television Championship.

Title history

Names

Reigns

Combined reigns

Footnotes

See also
CWFH Heritage Heavyweight Championship
AEW TNT Championship

References

External links

Wrestling titles
  UWN Television Championship

United Wrestling Network championships
Television wrestling championships